The Avro 534 Baby (originally named the "Popular") was a British single-seat light sporting biplane built shortly after the First World War.

Development
The Avro Baby was a single-bay biplane of conventional configuration with a wire-braced wooden structure covered in canvas. It had equal-span, unstaggered wings which each carried two pairs of ailerons. Initially, the aircraft was finless and had a rudder of almost circular shape. There were later variations of this. The main undercarriage was a single-axle arrangement and with a tailskid.

The first Babies were powered by a water-cooled inline Green C.4 engine of pre-1914 design that had previously been installed in the Avro Type D, though thoroughly remodelled postwar by the Green Engine Co. Ltd. It produced 35 hp (26 kW). Most of the later Babies also used this engine design, new-built from original Green drawings by Peter Brotherhood Limited of Peterborough, though some variants used either a 60 hp (45 kW) ADC Cirrus 1 or an 80 hp (60 kW) le Rhone. These new-build Greens were about 6 lb (3 kg) lighter.

The prototype first flew on 30 April 1919 from Avro's Hamble airfield. It crashed on the nearby foreshore two minutes into the flight due to pilot error. The second prototype flew successfully on 31 May 1919.

The type 534A Water Baby was a floatplane version with an altered rudder and large fin. The fourth (counting the short-lived prototype) Baby was designated Type 534B, distinguished by its plywood-covered fuselage and reduced-span lower wing. The Type 534C had both wings clipped for racing in the 1921 Aerial Derby. The 534D was a Baby modified for hot climates and was used by a businessman in India. All 534s were Green-engined single-seaters.

The Type 543 Baby was a two-seater with a 2 ft 6 in (76 cm) fuselage extension. It too was initially Green-powered, but in 1926, this was replaced by an 80 hp (60 kW) ADC Cirrus 1 air-cooled upright inline engine.

The final version of the Baby was the type 554 Antarctic Baby, built as photographic aircraft for the 1921–1922 Shackleton-Rowett Expedition to Antarctica. This had an 80 hp (60 kW) le Rhone engine, raised tailplanes, rounded wingtips and tubular steel struts replacing rigging wires to avoid the problems of tensioning rigging wires with gloved hands. Like the Water Baby, it was a floatplane.

By far the strangest Baby was one modified by H.G. Leigh in 1920. The original wings were removed and instead the aircraft had a short, conventional, shoulder-mounted wing, bearing projecting, full-span ailerons. Above it was a strongly forward-staggered stack of six very narrow-chord wings of about the same span as the lower wing, hence each of very high aspect ratio and therefore with low induced drag. This complicated structure added about 60 lb (30 kg) to the weight. This "Venetian blind" wing design was proposed and previously explored by Horatio Phillips in the last decade of the 19th century.

Operational history
The Babies were raced in the early 1920s by a variety of pilots but are best remembered for the flights of G-EACQ in the hands of Bert Hinkler. On 31 May 1920 he made a non-stop flight from Croydon to Turin in 9 hours 30 minutes – a flight of 655 mi (1,050 km) and celebrated at the time as "the most meritorious flight on record". On 24 July, he won second place in the handicap category of the Aerial Derby at Hendon, and on 11 April 1921 set a new distance record in Australia when he flew the Baby non-stop from Sydney to his home town of Bundaberg 800 mi (1,288 km) away, making the flight in 8 hours 40 minutes. Hinkler's Baby is preserved at the Hinkler Hall of Aviation in Bundaberg.

In June 1922, another Baby made the first flight between London and Moscow when the Russian Gwaiter collected his machine from Hamble and flew it home.
  
The Antarctic Baby (or most of it) accompanied Ernest Shackleton on his final expedition to the Antarctic. Unfortunately, their ship, the Quest, delayed by engine trouble was not able to pick up the missing parts previously transported to Rio de Janeiro and the Avro was not used at the Pole.

Specifications (534 Baby, post-war Green engine)

References

Bibliography
 Jackson, A.J. Avro Aircraft since 1908. London: Putnam Aeronautical Books 2nd edition, 1990. .
 
  Taylor, John W. R. A Picture History of Flight.  London: Hulton Press, 1955.
 Taylor, Michael J. H. Jane's Encyclopedia of Aviation'. London: Studio Editions, 1989.  .

Further reading

  Contemporary technical description with photographs and drawings.

1910s British sport aircraft
Baby
Single-engined tractor aircraft
Biplanes
Aircraft first flown in 1919